Mamba is a steel roller coaster located at Worlds of Fun in Kansas City, Missouri. Designed by Steve Okamoto and manufactured by D.H. Morgan Manufacturing, Mamba opened to the public on April 18, 1998. It is classified as a hypercoaster, which is any coaster that exceeds  in height or drop length, and cost $10 million to construct.  As of 2022, Mamba is tied with Steel Force at Dorney Park & Wildwater Kingdom in Allentown, Pennsylvania as the eighth longest steel coaster in the world.

History 
On September 11, 1997, Worlds of Fun announced that Mamba would be added to the park. The ride would be a hypercoaster by D.H. Morgan Manufacturing. The coaster would be located in the Africa section of the park. Mamba officially opened on April 18, 1998.

Ride elements 
205 foot 1st hill
184 foot 2nd hill
580° helix at speed 60+ mph drop on the first hill
5 camelback hills including a "double-up" bump

Trains 
3 trains with 6 cars per train. Riders are arranged 2 across in 3 rows, for a total of 36 riders per train.

Rankings

References

External links 

 Official page
 Mamba at the Roller Coaster DataBase

Roller coasters in Missouri
Roller coasters introduced in 1998
Worlds of Fun
Roller coasters operated by Cedar Fair